Poeciloxestia elegans is a species of beetle in the family Cerambycidae. It is found in Brazil.

References 

 Bezark, Larry G. A Photographic Catalog of the Cerambycidae of the World. Retrieved on 22 May 2012.

External links 
 
 Poeciloxestia elegans at insectoid.info

elegans
Beetles described in 1833
Fauna of Brazil